List of military divisions — List of British divisions in the First World War

This page is a list of British divisions that existed in the First World War. Divisions were either infantry or cavalry. Divisions were categorised as being 'Regular Army' (professional), 'Territorial Force' (part-time) or 'New Army' (wartime). The 'Territorial' cavalry was referred to as Yeomanry.

Infantry

Cavalry

See also
 British infantry brigades of the First World War
 List of British divisions in World War II
 List of Indian divisions in World War I

External links
The British Army in the Great War

Lists of military units and formations of World War I
 
World War I
Military_units_and_formations_of_the_United_Kingdom_in_World_War_I
Lists of divisions (military formations)